William Alwyn  (born William Alwyn Smith; 7 November 1905 – 11 September 1985), was an English composer, conductor, and music teacher.

Life and music

William Alwyn was born William Alwyn Smith in Northampton, the son of Ada Tyler (Tompkins) and William James Smith. He showed an early interest in music and began to learn to play the piccolo. At the age of 15 he entered the Royal Academy of Music in London where he studied flute and composition. He was a virtuoso flautist and for a time was a flautist with the London Symphony Orchestra. Alwyn served as professor of composition at the Royal Academy of Music from 1926 to 1955.

Alwyn was a distinguished polyglot, poet, and artist, as well as musician. In 1948 he became a member of the Savile Club in London. He helped found the Composers' Guild of Great Britain (now merged into the British Academy of Songwriters, Composers and Authors), and was its chairman in 1949, 1950 and 1954. He was also sometime Director of the Mechanical-Copyright Protection Society, a Vice-President of the Society for the Promotion of New Music (S.P.N.M.) and Director of the Performing Right Society. For many years he was one of the panel engaged by the BBC to read new scores to help assess whether the works should be performed and broadcast. He was appointed a CBE in 1978 in recognition of his services to music.

His compositional output was varied and large and included five symphonies, four operas, several concertos, film scores and string quartets.

Alwyn wrote over 70 film scores from 1941 to 1962. His classic film scores included Green for Danger, Odd Man Out, Desert Victory, Fires Were Started, The History of Mr. Polly, The Fallen Idol, The Black Tent, The Way Ahead, The True Glory and The Crimson Pirate. Some of the scores have been lost, although many scores and sketches are now in the William Alwyn Archive at Cambridge University Library. In recent years CD recordings have been made.  Some works, for which only fragmentary sketches remained, were reconstructed by Philip Lane or Christopher Palmer from the film soundtracks themselves.

Alwyn relished dissonance, and devised his own alternative to twelve-tone serialism. For instance, in his third symphony (1955–56), eight notes of the possible twelve are used in the first movement, with the remaining four (D, E, F, and A) constituting the middle movement, and all twelve being combined for the finale. The work was premièred on the 10th of October 1956 at the Royal Festival Hall by Sir Thomas Beecham.

Alwyn's concerto for harp and string orchestra, Lyra Angelica, was popularized when the American figure skater Michelle Kwan performed to it at the 1998 Winter Olympics.

William Alwyn spent the last twenty-five years of his life at Lark Rise, Dunwich Road, Blythburgh, Suffolk, where he composed his Concerto Grosso no. 3 (1964) two operas, Juan, or the Libertine and  Miss Julie and his last major orchestral work, Symphony No. 5 Hydriotaphia (1972–73).

Alwyn recorded his five symphonies as conductor for the Lyrita label in the 1970s, recordings which have since been reissued on CD.  Most of Alwyn's orchestral and chamber music has more recently been recorded on CD for Chandos Records: the five symphonies were played by the London Symphony Orchestra conducted by Richard Hickox.

Alwyn's opera Miss Julie has been recorded twice: for Lyrita, and in 2019 for Chandos conducted by Sakari Oramo.

Personal life 
He was married first to Olive Mary Audrey (Pull). He died in Southwold, Suffolk, in 1985. Alwyn was survived by his second wife, the composer Doreen Carwithen. His great-grandson is the actor Joe Alwyn.

Selected works
Stage
 The Fairy Fiddler, opera (1922)
 Fedelma, mime ballet in one scene (February 1931); libretto: Padraic Colum, choreography: Ninette de Valois; costumes: Dolly Travers-Smith; Abbey Theatre Dublin
 Farewell, Companions, Radio opera (1955); libretto by H.A.L. Craig
 Juan, or The Libertine, opera in 4 acts (1965–1971); libretto by the composer freely adapted from James Elroy Flecker's play Don Juan and other works
 Miss Julie, opera in 2 acts (1972–1976); libretto by the composer after the 1888 play by August Strindberg

Orchestral
 Five Preludes (1927)
 Aphrodite in Aulis, Eclogue after George Moore for small orchestra (1932)
 The Innumerable Dance, an English Overture (1933)
 Tragic Interlude for 2 horns, timpani and string orchestra (1936)
 Overture to a Masque (1940)
 Concerto Grosso No. 1 in B major (1942)
  Score for Country Town (1943)
 Suite of Scottish Dances for small orchestra (1946)
 Concerto Grosso No. 2 in G major for string quartet and string orchestra (1948)
 Symphony No. 1 (1948–1949)
 Festival March (1951)
 The Magic Island, Symphonic Prelude (1952)
 Symphony No. 2 (1953)
 Symphony No. 3 (1955–1956)
 Elizabethan Dances (1956–1957)
 Fanfare for a Joyful Occasion for brass and percussion (1958)
 Symphony No. 4 (1959)
 Derby Day, Overture (1960)
 Concerto Grosso No. 3 (1964)
 Sinfonietta [No. 1] for string orchestra (1970)
 Symphony No. 5 Hydriotaphia (1972–1973)
 Sinfonietta No. 2 for string orchestra (1976)

Band
 The Moor of Venice, Overture for brass band (1956)

Concertante
 Piano Concerto No. 1 (1930)
 Violin Concerto (1939)
 Pastoral Fantasia for viola and string orchestra (1939)
 Concerto for oboe, harp and strings (1944)
 Autumn Legend for cor anglais and string orchestra (1954)
 Lyra Angelica, Concerto for harp and string orchestra (1954)
 Piano Concerto No. 2 (1960)
 Concerto for flute and 8 wind instruments (1980)	

Chamber music
 Sonatina for violin and piano (1933)
 Sonata for oboe and piano (1934)
 2 Folk Tunes for cello or viola and piano (or harp) (1936)
 Novelette for string quartet (1938)
 Ballade for viola and piano (1939)
 Sonata Impromptu for violin and viola (1939)
 Rhapsody for violin, viola, cello and piano (1939)
 Divertimento for solo flute (1940)
 Sonatina for viola and piano (1941)
 Suite for oboe and harp (1944)
 Sonata for flute and piano (1948)
 Three Winter Poems for string quartet (1948)
 Conversations for violin, clarinet and piano (1950)
 Trio for flute, cello and piano (1951)
 String Quartet No. 1 in D minor (1953)
 Crepuscule for harp (1955)
 Sonata for clarinet and piano (1962)
 String Trio (1962)
 Moto Perpetuo for recorders (1970)
 Naiades, Fantasy Sonata for flute and harp (1971)
 String Quartet No. 2 Spring Waters (1975)
 Chaconne for Tom for descant recorder and piano (1982)
 String Quartet No. 3 (1984)

Piano
 Hunter's Moon (1920s)
 Odd Moments, Suite (1920s)
 The Orchard (1920s)
 Haze of Noon (1926)
 Two Irish Pieces
 April Morn, 4 Petites Pièces (1924–1926)
 Fancy Free, 4 Pieces
 Contes Barbares, Hommage à Paul Gauguin (1930–1933)
 Night Thoughts (1940)
 Prelude and Fugue Formed on an Indian Scale (1945)
 Sonata alla Toccata (1946)
 By the Farmyard Gate, 4 Pieces
 From Ireland, 7 Traditional Tunes
 Wooden Walls, Suite
 Midsummer Night, Suite
 Green Hills
 Five Pieces, Suite
 Two Intermezzi
 Two Pieces
 Harvest Home, Suite
 The Tinker's Tune
 Down by the Riverside
 Nine Children's Pieces
 Fantasy-Waltzes (1956)
 Twelve Preludes (1958)
 Movements (1961)
 Twelve Diversions for the Five Fingers

Vocal and Choral
 The Marriage of Heaven and Hell, oratorio (1936, fp. 18 February 2023, King's College, London)
 3 Songs to Words by Trevor Blakemore for voice and piano (1940)
 Mirages, Song Cycle for baritone and piano (1970)
 6 Nocturnes for baritone and piano (1973)
 Invocations, Song Cycle for soprano and piano (1977)
 A Leave Taking, Songs for tenor and piano (1978)
 Seascapes, Song Cycle for soprano, treble recorder and piano (1980)

Film scores

References

External links
William Alwyn Foundation
William Alwyn at MusicWeb International
William Alwyn Archive at Cambridge University Library
Philip Lane on reconstructing Alwyn's film scores

The Innumerable Dance: The Life and Work of William Alwyn by Adrian Wright, the first full biography published by the Boydell Press in 2008.
Composing in words: William Alwyn on his art edited by Andrew Palmer, includes many of Alwyn's autobiographical writings, and other writings on music published by Toccata Press, 2009.

1905 births
1985 deaths
20th-century classical composers
English classical composers
English opera composers
Male opera composers
English male classical composers
English conductors (music)
British male conductors (music)
English film score composers
English male film score composers
Alumni of the Royal Academy of Music
Academics of the Royal Academy of Music
People from Northampton
People from Blythburgh
Commanders of the Order of the British Empire
London Symphony Orchestra players
English classical flautists
20th-century British conductors (music)
20th-century English musicians
20th-century British composers
20th-century British male musicians
20th-century British musicians
20th-century flautists